The VG 8020 was Philips' third MSX 1 computer, after the VG8000 (which did not even have a printer port) and the VG8010 computers.

This version had a real keyboard, not a chiclet keyboard like its predecessors. The VG-8020 was released in 1984 and featured a Zilog Z80A microprocessor clocked at 3.56 MHz, 64KB of RAM, 16KB of VRAM, and two cartridge slots.

MSX